Capixaba is a  municipality located in the southeast of the Brazilian state of Acre. Its population is 12,008 and its area is 1,713 km².

The municipality contains part of the  Chico Mendes Extractive Reserve, a sustainable use environmental unit created in 1990.

References

Municipalities in Acre (state)